The northern blunt-spined monitor (Varanus primordius), is a species of lizard in the family Varanidae. The species is native to Australia's tropical Northern Territory. It is listed as Near Threatened on the IUCN Red List.

References

Reptiles of the Northern Territory
Varanus
Reptiles described in 1942
Taxa named by Robert Mertens